Paul Carl Beiersdorf (26 March 1836 – 17 December 1896) was a German pharmacist from Neuruppin, Brandenburg. He was founder of Beiersdorf AG in Hamburg.

Life 

In 1880 he founded the Beiersdorf Company, a Hamburg pharmaceutical operation where he had close business ties to dermatologist Paul Gerson Unna. In 1882 Beiersdorf developed and patented a new type of medical plaster called Guttaperchapflastermulle (gutta-percha plaster gauze). The date of patent specification, 28 March 1882, is considered to be the founding date of Beiersdorf AG.

In 1890 he sold the company to pharmacist Oscar Troplowitz, who retained the company's name of "Beiersdorf". Today, Beiersdorf AG is a multi-national corporation that is based in Hamburg, and manufactures personal care products.

References

External links 
  Beiersdorf AG Web Site
  Historical Figures at Beiersdorf

1836 births
1896 deaths
People from Neuruppin
People from the Province of Brandenburg
German pharmacists
19th-century German inventors
German company founders
19th-century German businesspeople
Beiersdorf people